Luis Carlos Murillo (born 16 October 1990) is a Colombian footballer who plays as a defender. He is currently free agent.

Club career
Born in Turbo, Colombia, Murillo joined Once Caldas in 2010, making his senior debut in the same season. He went on to win the 2010 Clausura, besides ending second in 2011 Clausura with the club. In order to get more first team appearances, he joined Deportivo Pasto on a loan deal on 12 July 2013

On 16 January 2018, Murillo signed with Finnish club KuPS on a one-year contract. He won the Veikkausliiga with KuPS in 2019.

On 29 October 2019, HJK announced the signing of Murillo on a two-year contract.

Career statistics

Honours
KuPS
Veikkausliiga: 2019
Individual
Veikkausliiga Defender of the Year: 2019 
Veikkausliiga Team of the Year: 2019, 2020, 2021, 2022

References

1990 births
Living people
Association football defenders
Colombian footballers
Once Caldas footballers
Deportivo Pasto footballers
Kuopion Palloseura players
Helsingin Jalkapalloklubi players
Categoría Primera A players
Veikkausliiga players
Colombian expatriate footballers
Expatriate footballers in Finland
Colombian expatriate sportspeople in Finland
Sportspeople from Antioquia Department